The Towers was a private Roman Catholic day school for girls aged 4–16 and boys up to age 11 in Upper Beeding near Steyning, West Sussex, England.

History
The Towers was founded by the Sisters of the Blessed Sacrament. They had left France for England to escape the increasing anti-religious environment, having been invited by Mrs Maling Wynch, a friend of the Congregation, to take up residence at The Towers, at the time leased by her brother-in-law. The first pupils arrived from France in 1903 to begin classes. After renting The Towers for several years, Elizabeth Maling Wynch (later to become Sister Mary Agnes), bought the property, and left it to the Congregation in her will.

Due to falling pupil numbers which resulted in the school not being financially viable, the Sisters made the decision to announce that the school would close at the end of the 2020 academic year. From September 2020, the premises are being leased to Steyning Grammar School and are intended to become a sixth form centre. The Sisters remain resident at The Towers continuing their community work.

The Towers
The Towers takes its name from the building and the surrounding premises it occupies. It was once owned by the Lord of the Manor of Beeding. The Towers was sold to George Smith during the 1870s. The original building was completed in 1883 and was described as a "monument to Victorian extravagance" or "Smith's folly" due to its construction cost. The Towers was turned into a hunting lodge before the Sisters took over. The original buildings were designated Grade II listed buildings in 1980.

References

External links
Profile on the ISC website

Girls' schools in West Sussex
Defunct schools in West Sussex
Defunct Catholic schools in the Diocese of Arundel and Brighton
1903 establishments in England
Educational institutions established in 1903
Grade II listed educational buildings
Grade II listed buildings in West Sussex
Catholic boarding schools in England
Educational institutions disestablished in 2020
2020 disestablishments in England